Takashi Irie (Japanese: 入江 隆, born May 10, 1958) is a retired Japanese light-flyweight freestyle wrestler. He won a silver medal at the 1984 Olympics and a gold medal at the 1978 Asian Games, placing third in 1986.

References

External links
 

1958 births
Living people
Olympic wrestlers of Japan
Wrestlers at the 1984 Summer Olympics
Japanese male sport wrestlers
Olympic silver medalists for Japan
Olympic medalists in wrestling
Asian Games medalists in wrestling
Wrestlers at the 1986 Asian Games
Wrestlers at the 1978 Asian Games
Medalists at the 1984 Summer Olympics
Medalists at the 1986 Asian Games
Medalists at the 1978 Asian Games
Asian Games gold medalists for Japan
Asian Games bronze medalists for Japan
Asian Wrestling Championships medalists
20th-century Japanese people